Törökkoppány is a village in Somogy county, Hungary.

Culture
The Hungarian folk song Kinyílt a rózsa, hajlik az ága was collected in 1923 in Törökkoppány by László Lajtha.

External links 
 Street map (Hungarian)

References 

Populated places in Somogy County